Khortha may refer to:
 Khortha language, Indo-Aryan language of Jharkhand, India
 Khortha, India, a village in Uttar Pradesh, India